As of November 2014, Ministry of Defence Police locations and units include:

Force Headquarters
Wethersfield

Criminal Investigation Department
CID officers are controlled centrally from Wethersfield and are located in regional offices based at Catterick, Clyde and Wethersfield.

National mobile units
Nuclear Guard Force—assembled from officers nationwide once activated by NARO and deployed to a specific incident.
Operational Support Unit North—based at Linton-on-Ouse.
Operational Support Unit South—based at Wethersfield.
Special Escort Group—based at Aldermaston.

Regional mobile units
Central Support Group Aldershot
Central Support Group Bicester
Central Support Group Scotland

Stations

Nuclear Division
Abbey Wood (Nuclear Division HQ)
Aldermaston
Burghfield
Coulport
Faslane
Vulcan

Territorial Division
Alconbury
Bacton
Beith
Bicester/Kineton (station administration amalgamated)
Caledonia
Cheltenham
Corsham
Croughton
Crombie
Devonport
Donnington
Easington
Fairford
Fort Blockhouse
Fort Halstead
Fylingdales
Garlogie
Glen Douglas
Gosport
Hereford
Lakenheath, Mildenhall, Feltwell (tri-base unit)
Longtown
Marchwood
Menwith Hill
Oakhanger
Porton Down
Portsmouth
Regent's Park
St Fergus
Whitehall
York (Territorial Division HQ)

Defence Community Police Officer posts
Albemarle
Blandford
Bovington
Catterick
Deepcut and Pirbright
Harrogate
Innsworth
Inverness
Leconfield
Marchwood
Northern Ireland
Poole
Shorncliffe
St Athan
Winchester

References

 MDP Station Locations , August 2019 v3

Ministry of Defence Police